Mataswintha, also spelled Matasuintha, Matasuentha, Mathesuentha, Matasvintha, or Matasuntha, was a daughter of Eutharic and Amalasuintha. She was a sister of Athalaric, King of the Ostrogoths. Their maternal grandparents were Theodoric the Great and Audofleda.

According to the Getica by Jordanes,
"Eutharic, who married Amalasuentha...begat Athalaric and Mathesuentha. Athalaric died in the years of his childhood, and Mathesuentha married Vitiges, to whom she bore no child. Both of them were taken together by Belisarius to Constantinople. When Vitiges passed from human affairs, Germanus the patrician, a cousin of the Emperor Justinian, took Mathesuentha in marriage and made her a Patrician Ordinary. And of her he begat a son, also called Germanus. But upon the death of Germanus, she determined to remain a widow."

According to Patrick Amory, she was forced to marry Witigis after the murder of her mother, and her cousin Theodahadus.

Her son Germanus was born following the death of his father (late 550/early 551). Nothing further is known of him with certainty, although he can possibly be identified with the patricius Germanus, a leading senator in the reign of Emperor Maurice (r. 582–602). Germanus' daughter married Maurice's eldest son Theodosius. Michael Whitby identifies the younger Germanus with Germanus, a son-in-law of Tiberius II Constantine and Ino Anastasia.

In fiction
Mataswintha is the subject of an opera by Xaver Scharwenka, composed in 1891 and 1892, and premiered in 1894. Georgine von Januschofsky sang the title role in 1897. She was portrayed by Harriet Andersson in the 1968 film Kampf um Rom.
As "Mathaswentha", she appears as a character in the time travel novel Lest Darkness Fall, by L. Sprague de Camp, where Wittigis tries to force her to marry him.

References

Bibliography

 
 
 

Ostrogothic queens consort
Justinian dynasty
6th-century Byzantine people
6th-century Ostrogothic people
6th-century Italian women
6th-century Byzantine women